Bmakine     is a village in the Aley District of Lebanon. It is 700 meters above sea level.

Location and geography
Bmakine lies on a hill in Aley, overlooking the Mediterranean sea from the west, 20 minutes away from Beirut.

History
In 1838, Eli Smith noted  the place, called Bmikkin, located in  El-Ghurb el-Fokany, upper el-Ghurb.

References

Bibliography

See also
List of cities in Lebanon

External links
 Bmakine, Localiba

Populated places in Aley District